Line 3 of the Guadalajara urban rail system is the third public transport railway line in the Guadalajara metropolitan area (México) and currently the longest in it. The line connects the Historical Centres of Zapopan, Guadalajara and Tlaquepaque, through the Diagonal Metropolitan Vial Corridor; consisting of Juan Gil Preciado, Juan Pablo II, Manuel Ávila Camacho, Alcalde / 16 de Septiembre and Revolución / Francisco Silva Romero avenues, from the Arcos de Zapopan neighbourhood (in Zapopan) until the Central Camionera Oriente of Guadalajara (in Tlaquepaque). It has 18 stations from south-east to north-west, of which 13 are elevated (in 2 viaducts) and 5 are underground; along 21.5 km (red line, in the technical datasheet outline). It is estimated that the line moves 233,000 daily passengers.

This infrastructure project was announced by Enrique Peña Nieto through the SCT as one out of five commitments that he promised at the beginning of his presidency in terms of railway transport.

Construction 
Since August 7, 2014, when the construction of this line 3 of the electric train began, it was foreseen that the line would be completed in mid-2017, but due to delays caused by budget changes, the line was actually inaugurated in September 2020. The TBM La Tapatia, which belongs to the Spanish company Sacyr, drilled to a maximum depth of 30 meters from La Normal with the aim of completing the underground section in Plaza de la Bandera.

In October 18, the length of the built tunnel reached 2.820 meters -out of a total of 4.005 meters- (without including the sections that connect with the viaducts neither the length of both mentioned stations), with a diameter of 11,5 meters.

“La Tapatía” resumed its advance after surpassing muddy ground between the Catedral and Independencia stations; reason for which Rodolfo Guadalajara, head of SITEUR, trusted that the excavation would not face any more technical issues and that it would complete before finishing 2017. More concretely, Salvador Fernández Ayala -representative of the SCT in Jalisco- pointed out to the local media that the TBM would complete the work in December 2017 and that the line 3 would start operating at the beginning of June or July 2018.

Yet, "La Tapatía" completed the tunnel in May 2018, which hinted that the work would not be completed before ending the presidential administration during which it was started.

Finally the governor Enrique Alfaro Ramírez announced in August 27 that the tests and works of line 3 would finish in August 30, and it actually was be ready to start operation in September 1st just like the president and governor had committed. But in order to open to the public, the governor remarked that they were waiting for the president Andrés Manuel López Obrador to do the inauguration. Such date was September 12, when, around 11:00 in the morning, the president inaugurated the line, and, afterwards, it was open to the public after 16:00 in the afternoon.

Work execution chronology 
After the start of the works in 2014, its estimated date of completion was originally planned in 2016; which would suppose a build time of only two years, and given the magnitude of the work, sounded very unrealistic. As the works progressed, the estimated completion date was delayed until December 2017 and then until March, May, July, or even September 2018. Nevertheless, during the mandates of Enrique Peña Nieto -president of the republic- and Jorge Aristóteles Sandoval Díaz -governor of the state of Jalisco- whom started the execution of the works, the works were not completed and they had been limited to do a "symbolic inauguration of technical tests", several days before ending their mandates on 1 and 5 December 2018, respectively.

It was the mandataries Andrés Manuel López Obrador, president of the nation, and Enrique Alfaro Ramírez, governor of the state of Jalisco, who had to inaugurate the Line 3 of the Electric Train.

Line 3 stations 

The 18 stations of this line are listed by name, based on citizen request, and include geographic reference points and/or tourist attractions; some even have multilingual references for non-Spanish-speaking foreigners.

Tolerance zones 
The line counts with smoking-tolerant zones for the people who would like to use the place to smoke.

Comprised tracks 
Viaduct 1 (elevated section): 

Starts in the Municipality of Zapopan; through Juan Gil Preciado Av. (Road to Tesistán) on its crossing with Arco del Triunfo Av. (Arcos de Zapopan station), Juan Pablo II Av. (Periférico Belenes, Mercado del Mar and Zapopan Centro stations), and Manuel Ávila Camacho Av. from the vehicular node Basílica until the Roundabout La Normal, in the Municipality of Guadalajara (Plaza Patria, Circunvalación Country and Ávila Camacho stations).

Tunnel (underground section):

It comprises 5.3 kilometres in the Municipality of Guadalajara; from Fray Antonio Alcalde / 16 de Septiembre Av. (La Normal, Santuario and Guadalajara Centro stations), until Revolución Av. (Independencia and Plaza de la Bandera stations)

Viaduct 2 (elevated section):

Starts in the Municipality of Tlaquepaque; crossing by the De Las Torres (Central de Autobuses station) and Francisco Silva Romero (Lázaro Cárdenas and Tlaquepaque Centro stations) avenues until Revolución Av. (Río Nilo, Revolución, and CUCEI stations).

Failed previous project 

In 2009, the then mayor of Tlajomulco -Enrique Alfaro Ramírez- proposed a failed project for a Line 3 of the Guadalajara light rail to the Jalisco State Congress; however it was rejected by partisan majority. The project would have been a completely overground line, which would run towards the south of the Guadalajara metropolitan area; starting its route at the Isla Raza station of Line 1 of the light rail running over the Miguel Topete street until its crossing with and taking over the Patria Sur Avenue, from there it would turn east to take the Luis Covarrubias street until a small fork to retake the Patria Sur Avenue, from there it would turn south taking the FF.CC. Guadalajara-Manzanillo tracks until the Hacienda Santa Fe colony, in the municipality of Tlajomulco.

With this project it was intended to benefit to more than 700.000 people, as the zones where the line would be built on suffer from a strong recession in public transport matter. Nonetheless, the Mexican Chamber of the Building Industry has resumed the discussion of the Guadalajara suburban train project, which, if completed, would benefit Tlajomulco through a massive railway transport system of users from and to the state capital; besides the Line 4 project already contemplated by the SCT, which is expected to be built the in the next administration and that will cross the Libertad and Reforma Guadalajara sectors.

Damages in the Guadalajara historic centre 
After the works for the underground section, La Tapatía passed below 342 houses; until February 2017 it had passed below 213, 6 of which are of relevant value. Only in 2.8% of such properties cracks have been found that do not depict structural damage: it comprises five houses and the Casa de los Perros, where only aesthetic cracks have been found which do not affect the structure itself. The TBM was already 60 metres ahead of the Metropolitan Cathedral, just below the Plaza de Armas, by which it was pointed out that the 400 years old property passed the "litmus test" despite the report of new cracks. "There is no affectation to be worried about, everything is inside the expected margin" – pointed out the head of SITEUR.

References 

Buildings and structures under construction in Mexico
Line 3 of the Guadalajara light rail system